Robert Agnew (June 4, 1899 – November 8, 1983) was an American movie actor who worked mostly in the silent film era, making 65 films in both the silent and sound eras. He was born in Dayton, Kentucky.

A review of The Heart of Broadway indicates the star power of the actor: "Bobby Agnew, always a favorite with film fans, certainly holds up his record in 'The Heart of Broadway'".

He died in 1983 in Palm Springs, California.

Partial filmography

 The Sporting Duchess (1920) - Dick Hammond
 The Valley of Doubt (1920) - Tommy
 The Frisky Mrs. Johnson (1920) - Lal Birkenread
 The Sin That Was His (1920) - (uncredited)
 The Highest Law (1921) - Bobby Goodwin
 The Passion Flower (1921) - Faustino Eusebio
 The Sign on the Door (1921) - Alan Churchill
 The Wonderful Thing (1921) - Laurence Mannerby
 Without Fear (1922) - Walter Hamilton
 Who Are My Parents? (1922) - Bob Hale
 Clarence (1922) - Bobby Wheeler
 A Dangerous Adventure (1922, Serial) - Jimmy Morrison
 Kick In (1922) - Jerry Brandon
 A Dangerous Game (1922) - John Kelley
 Pawn Ticket 210 (1922) - Chick Saxe
 Three Who Paid (1923) - Hal Sinclair
 Trimmed in Scarlet (1923) - David Peirce
 Prodigal Daughters (1923) - Lester Hodge
 Only 38 (1923) - Bob Stanley
 Bluebeard's 8th Wife (1923) - Albert deMarceau
 The Marriage Maker (1923) - Cyril Overton
 The Spanish Dancer (1923) - Juan
 Woman-Proof (1923) - Dick Rockwood
 Love's Whirlpool (1924) - Larry
 Those Who Dance (1924) - Matt Carney
 Broken Barriers (1924) - Bobbie Durland
 Wine of Youth (1924) - Bobby Hollister
 Wine (1924) - Harry Van Alstyne
 Troubles of a Bride (1924) - Robert Wallace
 Gold Heels (1924) - Boots
 The Denial (1925) - Young Officer
 Private Affairs (1925) - Fred Henley
 The Man Without a Conscience (1925) - James Warren
 Lost: A Wife (1925) - Dick
 Tessie (1925) - Roddy Wells
 Steppin' Out (1925) - Henry Brodman Jr.
 The Great Love (1925) - Dr. Lawrence Tibbits
 Wild Oats Lane (1926) - The Boy
 The Taxi Mystery (1926) - Harry Canby
 Racing Blood (1926) - James Fleminng
 Unknown Treasures (1926) - Bob Ramsey
 Dancing Days (1926) - Gerald Hedman
 Wandering Girls (1927) - Jerry Arnold
 Quarantined Rivals (1927) - Bruce Farney
 Fourth Commandment (1927) - Sonny
 Down the Stretch (1927) - Marty Kruger
 Snowbound (1927) - Peter Foley
 The Heart of Salome (1927) - Redfern
 She's My Baby (1927) - Bobby Horton
 The Prince of Headwaiters (1927) - Elliott Cable
 Slightly Used (1927) - Donald Woodward
 The College Hero (1927) - Bob Cantfield
 The Heart of Broadway (1928) - Billy Winters
 The Midnight Taxi (1928) - Jack Madison
 The Woman Racket (1930) - Rags
 French Kisses (1930, Short)
 Extravagance (1930) - Billy
 The Naughty Flirt (1931) - Wilbur Fairchild
 Golddiggers of 1933 (1933) - Dance Director (uncredited)
 Little Man, What Now? (1934) - Minor Role (uncredited) (final film role)

References

External links

 

1899 births
1983 deaths
American male film actors
American male silent film actors
People from Dayton, Kentucky
20th-century American male actors